"Maybe Love Will Change Your Mind" is a 1994 song by the American singer/songwriter Stevie Nicks. It was the first single from her solo album, Street Angel. The song peaked at No. 57 on the Billboard Hot 100.

Charts

Weekly charts

Year-end charts

Notes and references

''Crystal Visions – The Very Best of Stevie Nicks, liner notes and commentary
http://rockalittle.com/offtherecord.htm
http://www.allmusic.com/album/street-angel-mw0000101506

Stevie Nicks songs
1994 singles
1994 songs
Songs written by Rick Nowels
Modern Records (1980) singles